Porcel is a Spanish surname. Notable people with the surname include:
  
Antoine Porcel (1937–2014), French Olympic boxer
Baltasar Porcel (1937–2009), Spanish writer, journalist and literary critic
Bartomeu Rosselló-Pòrcel (1913–1938), Spanish poet
Jorge Porcel (1936–2006), Argentinean comedy actor and television host
José Antonio Porcel (1715–1794), Spanish poet and writer
Marisa Porcel (born 1943), Spanish stage, film and television actress
Mike Porcel, Cuban-American musician, guitarist, composer, orchestrator and songwriter 
Raúl Angelo Porcel Gonzáles (born 1954), Bolivian politician and journalist

See also
Porcelli
Porcellis

Spanish-language surnames